Minuartia cismontana is a species of flowering plant in the family Caryophyllaceae known by the common name cismontane minuartia.

It is native to Oregon and northern and central California, where it occurs in woodland and chaparral habitat, often on serpentine soils. It is similar to Minuartia californica and M. pusilla, but it was found to be a different species and was described as new in 1992.

Description
Minuartia cismontana is an ephemeral annual herb producing a stiff, erect, green or reddish purple stem up to about 25 centimeters tall from a thin taproot.

The small, sparse leaves are up to a centimeter long and not more than 1 or 2 millimeters wide. They are green or reddish purple in color, shiny and hairless.

The inflorescence contains up to 20 flowers with white petals, each on a thin branch.

References

External links
Calflora: Minuartia cismontana
 Jepson Manual Treatment: Minuartia cismontana
USDA Plants Profile: Minuartia cismontana
Flora of North America
Minuartia cismontana —The Nature Conservancy

cismontana
Flora of California
Flora of Oregon
Flora of the Cascade Range
Flora of the Klamath Mountains
Flora of the Sierra Nevada (United States)
Natural history of the California chaparral and woodlands
Natural history of the California Coast Ranges
Natural history of the Central Valley (California)
Plants described in 1992